The Norwegian Oil and Petrochemical Union (NOPEF) was a trade union representing workers in the oil and petrochemical sector in Norway.

The union was founded in 1977, and immediately affiliated to the Norwegian Confederation of Trade Unions.  By 1996, it had 12,334 members.

In 2006, it merged with the Norwegian Union of Chemical Industry Workers, to form Industri Energi.

Presidents
1977: Lars Anders Myhre
2000: Leif Sande

References

External links

Chemical industry trade unions
Trade unions established in 1977
Trade unions disestablished in 2006
Trade unions in Norway